Mohd Asghar Khan bin Goriman Khan (born 26 December 1965 in Selangor) is a Malaysian general who served as Chief of Royal Malaysian Air Force.

Honours
 :
 Commander of the Order of Meritorious Service (PJN) – Datuk (2020)
 Commander of the Order of Loyalty to the Crown of Malaysia (PSM) – Tan Sri (2022)
 :
 Officer of the Order of the Territorial Crown (KMW) (2010)
 Malaysian Armed Forces :
  General Service Medal (PPA)
  Loyal Service Medal (PPS)
  Malaysian Service Medal (PJM)
  Officer of the Most Gallant Order of Military Service (KAT)
  Warrior of the Most Gallant Order of Military Service (PAT)
  Loyal Commander of the Most Gallant Order of Military Service (PSAT)
  Courageous Commander of the Most Gallant Order of Military Service (PGAT) (2022)
 :
 Member of the Order of the Crown of Pahang (AMP)
 Companion of the Order of the Crown of Pahang (SMP)
 Knight Companion of the Order of the Crown of Pahang (DIMP) – Dato' (2014)
 Grand Knight of the Order of Sultan Ahmad Shah of Pahang (SSAP) – Dato’ Sri (2021)

References 

1965 births
Living people
Royal Malaysian Air Force personnel
People from Selangor
Commanders of the Order of Meritorious Service
Commanders of the Order of Loyalty to the Crown of Malaysia